Marcelo Saliola (born 31 December 1973) is a former professional tennis player from Brazil.

Saliola was the runner-up in the 1988 Junior Orange Bowl and won the South American Junior Championships in 1991, for the under 18 age bracket.

He had his best result on the ATP Tour at 1991 Brasilia Open when he made it into the round of 16, with a win over second seed and world number 12 Emilio Sánchez. He was a doubles quarter-finalist in the 1994 Colombia Open, partnering Otavio Della, with whom he won five Challenger titles.

The Brazilian won a bronze medal in the singles event at the 1991 Pan American Games

Challenger titles

Doubles: (5)

References

1973 births
Living people
Brazilian male tennis players
Tennis players at the 1991 Pan American Games
Tennis players from São Paulo
Pan American Games medalists in tennis
Pan American Games bronze medalists for Brazil
Medalists at the 1991 Pan American Games
20th-century Brazilian people
21st-century Brazilian people